Mintou Doucouré (born 19 July 1982) is a Malian former professional footballer who played as a midfielder.

Club career
Doucouré played in 2002 on loan by Dubai Club from JS Centre Salif Keita. In 2003 he returned to JS Centre Setif Keita, before being scouted by USM Alger 2005.

International career
Doucouré was part of the Malian 2004 Olympic football team, who exited in the quarter finals, finishing top of group A, but losing to Italy in the next round. He played formerly for the U-17 from Mali by 1999 FIFA U-17 World Championship in New Zealand.

References

External links

DZ Foot Profile

1982 births
Living people
Sportspeople from Bamako
Malian footballers
Association football midfielders
Mali international footballers
Footballers at the 2004 Summer Olympics
Olympic footballers of Mali
JS Centre Salif Keita players
USM Alger players
Malian Première Division players
Malian expatriate footballers
Malian expatriate sportspeople in Algeria
Expatriate footballers in Algeria
21st-century Malian people